REMBRANDT-2  is a submarine telecommunications cable system linking the United Kingdom and the Netherlands across the southern North Sea.  It is no longer in use.

It has landing points in:
Joss Bay, England, UK
Domburg, Netherlands

References

External links
KIS-ORCA.eu — Kingfisher Information Service - Offshore Renewals & Cables Awareness

Submarine communications cables in the North Sea
Netherlands–United Kingdom relations